The discography for electronic rock music group Julien-K.

Albums

Studio albums

Remix albums

Extended plays

Compilation albums

Singles

Released demos
"Look at U (2004 Demo)" (released on Initium Eyewear International Opticult compilation CD in 2004)
"Kick the Bass (2005 Demo)" (released as a pre-order bonus MP3 for Death to Analog from Metropolis Records)
"Everyone Knows (Demo)" (announced as exclusive free download release for members of the official Julien-K street team, Systeme De Street)

Other songs
 "Fail with Grace" (Sam Vandal featuring Ryan Shuck)
 "Superdiscount (Jagz Kooner Remix)" (Virgin Tears vs. Julien-K)
 "Crash" (Grey Saints vs. Julien-K)

Street Team exclusives
"Kick the Bass" (Virgin Tears & Fu Kick the Freebase Remix)
"Systeme de Sexe" (Live in Moline, Illinois) DVD

Other remixes
"Flashback" (iPunk Remix)  - free download
"Killing Fields" (Brandon Belsky Remix) - free download
"Someday Soon" (Motor Remix V1) - free download

Remixes for others
 "Flashback" by Motor (Julien-K Acid Test Remix) - iTunes bonus track on Motor's Unhuman album
 "Sleep When I'm Dead" by The Cure (Gerard Way & Julien-K Remix) – Released on Hypnagogic States EP
 "Neighborhood" by (Dirty Heads vs. Julien-K)- Clip on their official website
 "Strength of the World" by Avenged Sevenfold (Julien-K Remix) - Clip on their official website
 "What Do They Know?" (Mindless Self Indulgence vs. Julien-K & Chester Bennington) - Hot Topic exclusive CD, re-released via Metropolis Records
 "What Do They Know?" (Mindless Self Indulgence Vs. Julien-K & Chester Bennington - Instrumental DJ Dub) - free download from Julien-K.com

Soundtracks

Video games
Triple Threat: Sonic Heroes Vocal Trax – "This Machine"
Lost and Found: Shadow the Hedgehog Vocal Trax – "Waking Up"
Transformers: Revenge of the Fallen (Complete video game score)
True Colors: The Best of Sonic the Hedgehog Part 2 –  "Waking Up" and "This Machine"

Film
Underworld: Evolution – "Morning After" (Chester Bennington ft. Julien-K)
Transformers – "Technical Difficulties"
Matt's Chance (Complete original motion picture soundtrack)

Video albums

Music videos

References

Pop music group discographies
Discographies of American artists